Kafue Celtic Football Club (known as Kafue Celtic) is a Zambian football club based in Kafue, Zambia, that competes in the Zambia Super League.

History 
Founded in 2002, the team plays its home matches at Edwin Imboela Stadium. Founded in 2002, they started on the bottom of the Zambian football league system. The club is focused on youth development and the creation of player pathways with players like Enock Mwepu and Patson Daka signed for Premier League sides Brighton and Leicester City. These two transfers allowed the club to get around 7.9 million euros in Summer 2021 as 10% onward transfer fees and FIFA solidarity from FC Red Bull Salzburg.

Sponsorships 
In September 2021, the team secured a $30,000 sponsorship deal with Indo Zambia Bank.

Notable former players 
 Patson Daka
 Enock Mwepu

References

External links
 Kafue Celtic F.C. – Official club website

Football clubs in Zambia
Sport in Lusaka